The Central constituency (No.31) is a Russian legislative constituency in Tatarstan. Tatarstan gained 6th constituency after 2015 redistricting, the new constituency, named "Central", was placed into Kazan, its suburbs and exurbs, which were previously parts of Moskovsky, Nizhnekamsk and Privolzhsky constituencies.

Members elected

Election results

2016

|-
! colspan=2 style="background-color:#E9E9E9;text-align:left;vertical-align:top;" |Candidate
! style="background-color:#E9E9E9;text-align:leftt;vertical-align:top;" |Party
! style="background-color:#E9E9E9;text-align:right;" |Votes
! style="background-color:#E9E9E9;text-align:right;" |%
|-
| style="background-color: " |
|align=left|Irshat Minkin
|align=left|United Russia
|
|63.95%
|-
|style="background-color:"|
|align=left|Artem Prokofiev
|align=left|Communist Party
|
|10.86%
|-
|style="background:"| 
|align=left|Alfred Valiyev
|align=left|Communists of Russia
|
|6.15%
|-
|style="background-color:"|
|align=left|Aigul Faizullina
|align=left|A Just Russia
|
|5.67%
|-
|style="background-color:"|
|align=left|Marsel Gabdrakhmanov
|align=left|Liberal Democratic Party
|
|5.36%
|-
|style="background-color:"|
|align=left|Ruslan Zinatullin
|align=left|Yabloko
|
|3.30%
|-
|style="background-color:"|
|align=left|Maksim Krotov
|align=left|Rodina
|
|3.21%
|-
| colspan="5" style="background-color:#E9E9E9;"|
|- style="font-weight:bold"
| colspan="3" style="text-align:left;" | Total
| 
| 100%
|-
| colspan="5" style="background-color:#E9E9E9;"|
|- style="font-weight:bold"
| colspan="4" |Source:
|
|}

2021

|-
! colspan=2 style="background-color:#E9E9E9;text-align:left;vertical-align:top;" |Candidate
! style="background-color:#E9E9E9;text-align:left;vertical-align:top;" |Party
! style="background-color:#E9E9E9;text-align:right;" |Votes
! style="background-color:#E9E9E9;text-align:right;" |%
|-
|style="background-color: " |
|align=left|Marat Nuriyev
|align=left|United Russia
|
|56.93%
|-
|style="background-color:"|
|align=left|Artem Prokofiev
|align=left|Communist Party
|
|15.08%
|-
|style="background-color:"|
|align=left|Alfred Valiyev
|align=left|Communists of Russia
|
|6.83%
|-
|style="background-color:"|
|align=left|Vladimir Surchilov
|align=left|Liberal Democratic Party
|
|3.75%
|-
|style="background-color:"|
|align=left|Maksim Mukovnin
|align=left|A Just Russia — For Truth
|
|3.61%
|-
|style="background-color: " |
|align=left|Gulnaz Gizzatullina
|align=left|New People
|
|3.26%
|-
|style="background-color: "|
|align=left|Andrey Kuznetsov
|align=left|Party of Pensioners
|
|2.81%
|-
|style="background-color: " |
|align=left|Ruslan Zinatullin
|align=left|Yabloko
|
|2.34%
|-
|style="background-color: " |
|align=left|Mikhail Kuznetsov
|align=left|Party of Growth
|
|2.14%
|-
|style="background-color: " |
|align=left|Milyausha Khismatullina
|align=left|Civic Platform
|
|1.95%
|-
| colspan="5" style="background-color:#E9E9E9;"|
|- style="font-weight:bold"
| colspan="3" style="text-align:left;" | Total
| 
| 100%
|-
| colspan="5" style="background-color:#E9E9E9;"|
|- style="font-weight:bold"
| colspan="4" |Source:
|
|}

References

Russian legislative constituencies
Politics of Tatarstan